The Northern Theater Command Navy, or the North Sea Fleet (NSF) is one of the three fleets of the Chinese People's Liberation Army Navy, under the Northern Theater Command. In September 1950 the Qingdao Army Base was redesignated as a naval base. Following the departure of the Soviet Navy from Lüshunkou (Port Arthur), the North Sea Fleet was established in 1960 with naval bases in Qingdao and Lüshunkou. It includes the Aircraft carrier Liaoning, as well as nuclear-powered attack and missile submarines based at Qingdao bastion.

The North Sea Fleet was historically the most capable of the Navy's three fleets, being the first in China to operate destroyers, shore-based missiles and nuclear submarines. In recent years however, the shift in strengthening of importance and strategic capabilities of the East and South Sea Fleets are more prioritised.

See also 
 People's Liberation Army Navy
 East Sea Fleet
 South Sea Fleet
 Beiyang Fleet of the Qing navy from 1875-1898

References

External links 
 GlobalSecurity.org

 
Fleets of the People's Liberation Army Navy
Yellow Sea
Bohai Sea
Northern Theater Command
Jinan Military Region
1960 establishments in China
Military units and formations established in 1950